Claude Michel (born 26 September 1938) is a French politician.

Michel was born in Elne on 26 September 1938. He served on the National Assembly from 1973 to 1988, representing Eure's 2nd constituency until 1986, then was elected to his final term via the Socialist Party list.

References

1938 births
Living people
Deputies of the 5th National Assembly of the French Fifth Republic
Deputies of the 6th National Assembly of the French Fifth Republic
Deputies of the 7th National Assembly of the French Fifth Republic
Deputies of the 8th National Assembly of the French Fifth Republic
Socialist Party (France) politicians